195th may refer to:

195th (2/1st Scottish Rifles) Brigade, a Territorial Force division of the British Army during the First World War
195th (Airlanding) Field Ambulance, Royal Army Medical Corps unit of the British airborne forces during the Second World War
195th (City of Regina) Battalion, CEF, unit in the Canadian Expeditionary Force during the First World War
195th Fighter Squadron, unit of the Arizona Air National Guard 162d Fighter Wing located at Tucson Air National Guard Base, Arizona
195th Ohio Infantry (or 195th OVI), infantry regiment in the Union Army during the American Civil War
195th Street (Manhattan)
Pennsylvania's 195th Representative District

See also
195 (number)
195 (disambiguation)
195, the year 195 (CXCV) of the Julian calendar
195 BC